Shahrak-e Mahdavi (also known as Shahrak-e Mahdavī-ye ‘Olyā) is a village in Hana Rural District, Abadeh Tashk District, Neyriz County, Fars Province, Iran. At the 2006 census, its population was 239, in 58 families.

References 

Populated places in Abadeh Tashk County